SS Maloja was a Swiss cargo ship that was mistakenly sunk by  British aircraft in the Mediterranean Sea off Cap Revellata, Corsica on 7 September 1943 while she was travelling from Lisbon, Portugal to Genoa, Italy while carrying a cargo of 1800 tons of copra oil and 220 tons of bagged copra.

Construction 
Maloja was built at the Austin S. P. & Son Ltd. shipyard in Sunderland, United Kingdom in June 1906, where she was launched and completed that same year. The ship could generate 1200 r.h.p. with a speed of 9 knots.

Sinking 
Maloja was travelling from Lisbon, Portugal to Genoa, Italy while carrying a cargo of 1800 tons of copra oil and 220 tons of bagged copra when on 7 September 1943 at 16:15, she was mistakenly attacked by 10 British aircraft with machine guns and torpedoes in the Mediterranean Sea off Cap Revellata, Corsica. The ship caught fire after a torpedo hit and sank in 13 minutes with the loss of three of her 23 crew members. The survivors were rescued later that day.

Wreck 

References

1906 ships
Cargo ships
Steamships of Switzerland
Ships built on the River Wear
Maritime incidents in September 1943
World War II shipwrecks in the Mediterranean Sea
Ships sunk by British aircraft